Fabiano da Silva Souza (born February 17, 1990 in Campo Grande), simply known as Fabiano, is a Brazilian footballer who plays as left back for Portuguesa.

Career
Fabiano came through the youth ranks at CENE and made his senior debut in the 2010 Campeonato Brasileiro Série D game against Madureira on 7 August 2010. He played three seasons in Série D for the club, and had a loan spell at São José-RS in 2012, before signing for XV de Piracicaba in June 2013 to play in the 2013 Copa Paulista and 2014 Campeonato Paulista.

After four seasons of playing state league football in Campeonato Paulista and Campeonato Goiano he had a brief, largely unsuccessful spell with Remo in 2016. He signed for Bragantino soon after leaving Remo, and played three seasons in Série B and Série C with them, a period which also encompassed a loan spell with Água Santa in 2017 after the Série C campaign had finished.

In September 2018 he signed a contract with Vitória until the end of 2020, initially playing in the 2018 Campeonato Brasileiro Série A before being loaned to Coritiba for the 2019 season as part of the deal which saw Ruy being loaned in the other direction.

Career statistics

References

External links

1990 births
Living people
Brazilian footballers
Association football defenders
Esporte Clube São José players
Esporte Clube XV de Novembro (Piracicaba) players
Mirassol Futebol Clube players
Itumbiara Esporte Clube players
Clube do Remo players
Clube Atlético Bragantino players
Esporte Clube Água Santa players
Esporte Clube Vitória players
Coritiba Foot Ball Club players
Santa Cruz Futebol Clube players
Operário Ferroviário Esporte Clube players
Associação Portuguesa de Desportos players
Campeonato Brasileiro Série A players
Campeonato Brasileiro Série B players
Campeonato Brasileiro Série C players
Campeonato Brasileiro Série D players
People from Campo Grande
Sportspeople from Mato Grosso do Sul